Cool Love #1 is a 7 Inch EP by American country band Blitzen Trapper, released on September 19, 2008.

Track listing
 "Cool Love #1"
 "Boss King"
 "Jericho"
 "Jesus on the Mainline"

References

2008 albums
Blitzen Trapper albums